This article details the 2006–07 UEFA Cup qualifying rounds.

Times are CEST (UTC+2), as listed by UEFA (local times, if different, are in parentheses).

Round and draw dates
All draws held at UEFA headquarters in Nyon, Switzerland.

Matches may also be played on Tuesdays or Wednesdays instead of the regular Thursdays due to scheduling conflicts.

Teams
Below are the 100 teams involved in the qualifying rounds, grouped by their starting rounds. The 32 winners of the second qualifying round qualified for the first round.

First qualifying round

Seeding

Summary

|-
!colspan="5"|Southern-Mediterranean region
|-

|-
!colspan="5"|Central-East region
|-

|-
!colspan="5"|Northern region
|-

|}

Matches

Tirana won 3–1 on aggregate.

CSKA Sofia won 5–1 on aggregate.

Litex Lovech won 6–0 on aggregate.

Sarajevo won 5–0 on aggregate.

Domžale won 7–0 on aggregate.

Dinamo București won 9–1 on aggregate.

APOEL won 7–1 on aggregate.

Omonia won 4–3 on aggregate.

Lokomotiv Sofia won 3–1 on aggregate.

Roeselare won 7–2 on aggregate.

Rapid București won 6–0 on aggregate.

Vaduz won 4–1 on aggregate.

Zimbru Chișinău won 3–2 on aggregate.

Young Boys won 4–1 on aggregate.

2–2 on aggregate; Videoton won on away goals.

1–1 on aggregate; Dinamo Minsk won on away goals.

Karvan won 2–0 on aggregate.

2–2 on aggregate; Ameri won on away goals.

BATE won 3–0 on aggregate.

Basel won 3–1 on aggregate.

Artmedia won 3–2 on aggregate.

Drogheda United won 4–2 on aggregate.

Brøndby won 3–1 on aggregate.

Llanelli won 2–1 on aggregate.

Skonto won 5–0 on aggregate.

Åtvidaberg won 7–0 on aggregate.

Ventspils won 4–1 on aggregate.

Brann won 2–0 on aggregate.

2–2 on aggregate; Randers won on away goals.

Kaunas won 4–1 on aggregate.

Sūduva won 2–1 on aggregate.

Levadia Tallinn won 2–1 on aggregate.

Start won 4–0 on aggregate.

1–1 on aggregate; Flora Tallinn won on away goals.

Derry City won 2–0 on aggregate.

Second qualifying round

Seeding

Summary

|-
!colspan="5"|Southern-Mediterranean region
|-

|-
!colspan="5"|Central-East region
|-

|-
!colspan="5"|Northern region
|-

|}

Matches

Trabzonspor won 2–1 on aggregate.

Hapoel Tel Aviv won 4–2 on aggregate.

1–1 on aggregate; CSKA Sofia won on away goals.

Ethnikos Achna won 6–2 on aggregate.

Auxerre won 5–2 on aggregate.

Dinamo București won 2–1 on aggregate.

Partizan won 3–2 on aggregate.

Rapid București won 2–1 on aggregate.

Lokomotiv Sofia won 6–0 on aggregate.

Litex Lovech won 2–1 on aggregate.

Kayserispor won 5–1 on aggregate.

Artmedia won 5–3 on aggregate.

Sion won 1–0 on aggregate.

Grasshoppers won 3–1 on aggregate.

Slavia Prague won 2–0 on aggregate.

1–1 on aggregate; Chornomorets Odessa won on away goals.

2–2 on aggregate; Basel won on away goals.

Metalurh Zaporizhya won 3–0 on aggregate.

Wisła Kraków won 2–1 on aggregate.

Hertha BSC won 3–2 on aggregate.

Rubin Kazan won 5–0 on aggregate.

3–3 on aggregate; Marseille won on away goals.

1–1 on aggregate; Start won 11–10 on penalties

Odense won 6–1 on aggregate.

Randers won 3–2 on aggregate.

Levadia Tallinn won 2–1 on aggregate.

Newcastle United won 1–0 on aggregate.

4–4 on aggregate; Åtvidaberg won on away goals.

Molde won 2–1 on aggregate.

Brøndby won 4–0 on aggregate.

Club Brugge won 7–2 on aggregate.

Derry City won 7–3 on aggregate.

References

External links
Qualifying Rounds Information

Qualifying
July 2006 sports events in Europe
August 2006 sports events in Europe
UEFA Cup qualifying rounds